Western Star or The Western Star may refer to:

Newspapers
 The Western Star (Bessemer, Alabama), a weekly newspaper published in Bessemer, Alabama
 Western Star (Kerala), a defunct English newspaper in Kerala, India 
 The Western Star (Corner Brook), a newspaper in Corner Brook, Newfoundland
 The Western Star (Ohio), a defunct weekly newspaper in Lebanon, Ohio
 The Western Star (Queensland)
 The Western Star and Roma Advertiser

Transportation
 Western Star Trucks, an American manufacturer of commercial trucks 
 Western Star (train), a passenger train operated by the Great Northern Railway
 , a United States Navy cargo ship in commission from 1918 to 1919

Literature
 Western Star, an unfinished narrative poem, winner of the 1944 Pulitzer Prize for Poetry, on the settling of the United States written by Stephen Vincent Benét
 The Adventure of the Western Star, an adventure in the Poirot Investigates collection of short stories

Other Uses
 Western Star, Ohio, a community in the United States
 Western Star (butter), an Australian brand of butter produced by Fonterra

See also 
 Star of the West (disambiguation)